These are the Billboard magazine Hot R&B/Hip-Hop Songs chart number-one hits of 1990. There were 36 number-one singles, the longest number-one single was Pebbles' "Giving You the Benefit", which spent three weeks at the summit.

Chart history

See also
1990 in music
List of number-one R&B albums of 1990 (U.S.)
List of Billboard Hot 100 number-one singles of 1990

References

1990
1990 record charts
1990 in American music